110 N. Main Street is an office tower located in downtown Dayton, Ohio, United States. The building is 328 ft (100 m) tall and has 20 floors.

Opening in 1989 as Citizens Federal Centre, the building was later named Fifth Third Center before Fifth Third Bank moved to the One Dayton Centre in 2009. In 2011, Premier Health Partners acquired the building for $6.19 million. It is currently their headquarters.

See also
List of tallest buildings in Dayton

References

Skyscraper office buildings in Dayton, Ohio
Office buildings completed in 1989